AUK may refer to:
Auk, a type of bird
The Auk, now Ornithology, an American ornithological journal
AUK CORP, a Korean semiconductor and optoelectronic manufacturer
General Claude Auchinleck
AETN UK, a joint venture of A&E Television Networks and British Sky Broadcasting
Auk oilfield, oilfield near Aberdeen, Scotland
AUK, IATA code for Alakanuk Airport in the Kusilvak Census Area, Alaska
Audax UK, a cycling organisation

Universities
American University in Kosovo, part of the Rochester Institute of Technology
American University of Kuwait, a non-profit university in Kuwait
Agriculture University, Kota, in Rajasthan, India
The American University of Kurdistan (AUK), Dohuk, Iraq

See also
AWK (disambiguation)